Mirko Ivančić (born 5 June 1960) is a Croatian rower. He competed in the men's coxed pair event at the 1984 Summer Olympics.

References

External links
 

1960 births
Living people
Croatian male rowers
Olympic rowers of Yugoslavia
Rowers at the 1984 Summer Olympics
Rowers from Split, Croatia